Dream Country is the third full-length studio album by singer-songwriter Sarah Darling. It was first released digitally on February 10, 2017 by Be Darling Records, with a physical CD and LP concurrently release.

The album includes the singles "Halley’s Comet" and "Where Cowboys Ride" as well as the Sarah Darling's cover of The Smiths song, "Please, Please, Please, Let Me Get What I Want". Three music videos were also made to promote the release. A deluxe edition of the album was digitally released on the iTunes Store.

Track listing

Personnel
Charlie Worsham – additional vocals
Sam Palladio – additional vocals
Jessica Lee Campbell – additional vocals
Larissa Maestro – additional vocals
Dan Sommers – additional vocals
Larissa Maestro – string arrangement
Kristin Weber – fiddle
Zach Runquist – fiddle
Eleonore Denig– fiddle
Larissa Maestro – cello
Cheyenne Medders – electric guitar
Cheyenne Medders – acoustic guitar
Larissa Maestro – acoustic guitar
John Estes – double bass
Micah Hulscher – keyboard instruments
Mikie Martel – trumpet
Dan Sommers – trombone
Evan Hutchings – percussion instrument
Dan Sommers – percussion instrument

References

2017 albums
Sarah Darling albums